David or Dave Dennis may refer to:
Dave Dennis (DJ) (1937–2007), British pirate radio DJ
Dave Dennis (rugby union) (born 1986), Australian rugby union player
Dave Dennis (activist) (born 1940), American civil rights activist
David Dennis (actor) (born 1960), South African actor
David W. Dennis (1912–1999), American politician
David Dennis (rower) (born 1980), Australian Olympic rower